Andrew Lee Evans (born Wilfred Andrew Lever Evans) OAM (born 17 June 1935, in India) is a Pentecostal Christian pastor in the Assemblies of God and a former politician in the South Australian Legislative Council. Evans is most notable as pastor of the then Paradise Community Church (now Influencers Church) for 30 years and co-founding the conservative Family First Party.

Early life and education

Andrew L. Evans was born to missionary parents Tom and Stella Evans in India, and is the older brother of pastor Fred Evans. From 1958 to 1960, Evans studied for Christian Ministry at the Assemblies of God Commonwealth Bible College in Brisbane (now known as Alphacrucis in Parramatta, Sydney). He graduated with a Diploma in Theology in December 1960 and was ordained to the Ministry in 1963. He then served as a missionary with AOG World Missions in the East Sepik province of Papua New Guinea from 1963 to 1969.

Career

From 1970 Evans served as Senior Pastor first of Klemzig Assembly of God in Adelaide, then Paradise Assembly of God (now Influencers Church) when the church relocated there in 1982. In 1977 he became the National Superintendent of the Assemblies of God in Australia, which position he held for 20 years and saw a new church started every 11 days.

He retired as the senior pastor of Paradise AOG in 2000, after 30 years, the church had reached over 4000 members, when his eldest son assumed the leadership. Another son formed the Planetshakers Church in Melbourne.

Politics
After retiring, Evans helped co-found the Family First Party and was elected into the Legislative Council at the 2002 state election, retiring from service on 3 July 2008.

Awards and achievements

Evans received a Doctor of Divinity from the unaccredited California Graduate School of Theology on 5 August 1981. He was also awarded a Doctor of Ministries on 20 September 1994 from the School of Theology in California. He was awarded the Order of Australia Medal OAM for his service to the Christian Church 26 January 2003.

In the South Australian Parliament from 2002 to 2008, he
 introduced the Bill that removed the bar to prosecuting people for sexual offences committed before 1 December 1982
 introduced the motion that established the Select Committee into the Status of Fathers in South Australia
 Compelled the State Labor Government to include an interim 2020 target for its climate change legislation

References

External links
Jesus First: The Life and Leadership of Andrew Evans by Denise Austin
A brief history of the Assemblies of God in Australia.
Family First Party (South Australia) website

Family First Party politicians
Members of the South Australian Legislative Council
Recipients of the Medal of the Order of Australia
Living people
1935 births
Assemblies of God pastors
Australian Christian Churches people
21st-century Australian politicians